Needles is a locality and small rural community in the local government area of Meander Valley in the North West region of Tasmania.
The 2016 census determined a population of 37 for the state suburb of Needles.

History
The locality was named for Needles Ridge to the south.

Geography
Lobster Rivulet, a tributary of the Mersey River, forms the north-western boundary, while Leiths Creek, a tributary of the Meander River, forms the south-eastern boundary.

Road infrastructure
The B12 route (Mole Creek Road) enters the locality from the north-east and exits to the west. The C168 route (Dairy Plains Road) starts at an intersection with route B12 and exits to the south-west.

Notes

References

Localities of Meander Valley Council
Towns in Tasmania